Milk and Blood is the first solo album by former Faith No More guitarist Jim Martin, released on October 6, 1997. It contains twelve songs, including a cover of The Pogues' song "Navigator" and a re-recording of the Faith No More song "Surprise! You're Dead".

Track listing

Personnel 
 Jim Martin – guitar, vocals, producer, engineer
 Brent Weeks – bass
 Joe Cabral – drums, back cover
 James Hetfield – backing vocals

Footnotes 

Jim Martin (musician) albums
1997 debut albums